Hypoxis hygrometrica, known as the golden weather-grass, is a small herbaceous plant. It is found in south eastern Australia.

References

hygrometrica
Flora of New South Wales
Flora of Queensland
Flora of Victoria (Australia)
Flora of South Australia
Flora of Tasmania